The Far Eastern State University of Humanities (previously KSPU — Khabarovsk State Pedagogical University) is a university of the Khabarovsk Krai of the Far Eastern Russia.

History

Establishment
Far Eastern State University of Humanities was initially established as a Pedagogical Institute. The decision to establish a new Pedagogical Institute in 
the Far East of USSR was made in the year 1934.

Expansion and growth
Following the development of the institute and overall faculty growth in 1994, by the decision of Ministry of Education and Science of the Russian Federation the institute was transformed into Pedagogical University. In 2005, following the federal decision it was renamed as Far Eastern State University of Humanities.

Divisions and faculties
 Institute of psychology and management
 Faculty of physical culture
 Faculty of Biology and Chemistry
 Art and Design Division
 History Department
 Institute of Mathematics, Physics and Informational Technology
 Faculty of Philology
 Faculty of Special Psychology and Pedagogy
 Institute of Linguistics and International Communications
 Eastern Languages Department

Currently Far Eastern State University of Humanities has 6 campuses with specialized study and lecture halls and laboratories. There is an extensive library with specialized divisions for science, psychology and pedagogical practices, as well as rare books division and international literature division.

International partners
In early 1990 the University established a cooperation partnership with Lewis & Clark College (Portland, OR, USA). There are also established relations with the University of Hawaii (USA), and Osaka University (Japan), as well as cooperation agreements with University of Zurich (Switzerland) and University of Augsburg (Germany). In addition to student exchange programs this allows for joint scientific research and development studies.

References

External links
 

Educational institutions established in 1934
Education in Khabarovsk
Universities in the Russian Far East